Eccentric Soul: The Bandit Label is the third compilation by The Numero Group and second volume in the Eccentric Soul series.

Eccentric Soul: The Bandit Label took a look at the underside of Chicago soul through twenty tracks of R&B, soul, and funk. The album followed  the story of the fledgling Bandit label and its leader, Arrow Brown.

Track listing
 "One More Time Around" - The Majestic Arrows
 "We Have Love" - The Majestic Arrows
 "Another Day" - The Majestic Arrows
 "If You Love Me" - Altyrone Deno Brown
 "You've Got to Crawl to Me" - Johnnie Davis
 "Boogedy Boogedy" - Johnnie Davis and The Majestic Arrows
 "Doing It for Us" - The Majestic Arrows
 "Love Is All I Need" - The Majestic Arrows
 "Glad About That" - Linda Ballentine
 "Bring Back the One I Love" - The Majestic Arrows
 "The Magic of Your Love" - The Majestic Arrows
 "I'll Never Cry for Another Boy" - The Majestic Arrows
 "Sweet Pea" - Altyrone Deno Brown
 "The Love I See Now" - Johnnie Davis and The Majestic Arrows
 "We Love Together" - The Majestic Arrows
 "You're a Habit Hard to Break" - Linda Ballentine
 "Going to Make a Time Machine" - The Majestic Arrows

Extended play
18. "If I Had a Little Love" - The Majestic Arrows
19. "Make Yourself Over" (Rehearsal) - The Majestic Arrows
20. "I'll Never Cry for Another Boy" (Rehearsal) - The Majestic Arrows

References

External links
Numerogroup.com

2004 compilation albums
The Numero Group compilation albums